Arlene Shechet (born 1951) is an American artist. She lives and works in New York City, Woodstock, and Kingston, New York.

Early life and education
Shechet was raised in Forest Hills, Queens. She comes from an Ashkenazi Jewish background. Shechet's grandparents immigrated to the United States from Belarus in 1920.

Shechet received her Bachelor of Arts from New York University and her Masters of Fine Arts from the Rhode Island School of Design in 1978. Shechet taught at the Rhode Island School of Design from 1978 until 1985, and later at the Parsons School of Design from 1984 to 1995.

Work
Shechet is a sculptor working in a range of materials, including wood, ceramics, paper-making, porcelain, and clay. Shechet has said of her work, "Everybody wants to be able to tell a quick story, but I do not want to make something that fits into a few sentences. I don’t want it to have a punchline.” Shechet's early work was influenced by Buddhism, evident in the way it exhibited states of transformation and Buddhist subject matter. In the early 1990s, Shechet made a series of plaster sculptures. The lumpy works, supported by industrial and found objects, and incorporating Buddhist iconography, evolved into a family of Buddhas. In 1996 Shechet was invited to work at the Dieu Donné Papermill in New York. During her residency she created handmade, paper blueprints of stupas as well as paper vessels. 
Shechet continues to work with paper, implementing a hybrid approach by manipulating paper pulp in a similar fashion to clay. Her recent body of colorful paper works, completed in 2012, reveal her commitment to materials and the mold.

Her fascination with materials extends to clay, for which she is primarily know and has received wide recognition. Over the last decade, Shechet has worked prolifically with clay, creating an impressive body of work and pushing the boundaries of the material. From 2012 to 2013, Shechet held a residency at the Meissen Porcelain Manufactory in Germany, where she made experimental sculptures alongside factory employees making traditional porcelain work. Her time there yielded a new body of work which was installed by Shechet at the RISD Museum, Providence in 2014.

In 2013 for The New York Times, Roberta Smith described Shechet's work as combining painting and sculpture "with exuberant polymorphous, often comic results", and noted the variety of glazed surfaces on the vessels in her exhibition Slip, at Sikkema Jenkins & Co. A New Yorker capsule  review compared the work in this same exhibition to those of the ceramic artist and printmaker Ken Price. Shechet has also cited references as diverse as Elie Nadelman, Sophie Taeuber-Arp, Jim Nutt, and Umberto Boccioni.

The Institute of Contemporary Art, Boston exhibited a 20-year survey of her work in 2016, which The New York Times called "Some of the most imaginative American sculpture of the past 20 years.”

In 2017, Shechet was commissioned to create a sculpture for the collection of the Jewish Museum in New York City. The work, Travel Light, references her family's experience of migration to the United states. Two years later, in 2019, Shechet contributed to an audio tour for the Jewish Museum, where she discusses the process of creating her work. In 2018, Shechet was commissioned by Madison Square Park Conservancy to create a monumental site-specific installation for the Park, which was on view from view from September 25, 2018, through April 28, 2019.

Art market
Since 2018, Shechet has been represented by Pace Gallery. Formerly, Shechet has shown with galleries including Jack Shainman and Sikkema Jenkins & Co.

Personal life
Shechet lived in TriBeCa through the 1990s, however in 2002 she purchased a house in Woodstock, New York. This is currently her full-time home. She has two children, born in 1986 and 1990. Shechet is married to the psychiatrist Mark Epstein.

Exhibitions
Solo museum exhibitions of Shechet’s work include the RISD Museum, Providence in 2014; the Weatherspoon Art Museum, Greensboro, in 2012; the Nerman Museum of Contemporary Art, Kansas in 2012; The Tang Teaching Museum and Art Gallery, Saratoga Springs, NY in 2009; and the Museum of Contemporary Art Denver in 2009. A twenty-year survey of her work opened at the Institute of Contemporary Art, Boston in June 2015. Shechet is the first living artist to have an exhibition at the Frick Collection, New York, which was on view in 2016–2017. She had an exhibition at The Phillips Collection, DC, in 2016–2017.

Collections
Shechet's work is held numerous collections, including the following selection: 
Jewish Museum, New York City, New York 
Whitney Museum of American Art, New York City, New York 
The Brooklyn Museum, Brooklyn, New York 
The Metropolitan Museum of Art, New York City, New York 
L.A. County Museum, Los Angeles, CA

Awards
Shechet has received numerous awards, including a John Simon Guggenheim Memorial Foundation Fellowship Award in 2004, a Joan Mitchell Foundation Painters and Sculptors Grant in 2010, an American Arts and Letters Award in 2011, and three New York Foundation for the Arts awards.

References

External links
Arlene Schechet: All at Once, The Institute of Contemporary Art, Boston (June 10 - September 7, 2015)
Artist's website at http://www.arleneshechet.net/
Arlene Shechet at Sikkema Jenkins Co.
Arlene Shechet on Art21 

1951 births
Living people
20th-century American women artists
Sculptors from New York (state)
American contemporary artists
American women sculptors
New York University alumni
Rhode Island School of Design alumni
20th-century American ceramists
Jewish American artists
21st-century American women artists
21st-century American ceramists
American women ceramists
21st-century American Jews
20th-century American Jews
American people of Belarusian-Jewish descent